George Decalve "Jack" McAdams (December 17, 1886 – May 21, 1937) was a Major League Baseball pitcher who played in  with the St. Louis Cardinals.

External links

1886 births
1937 deaths
Major League Baseball pitchers
Baseball players from Arkansas
St. Louis Cardinals players
Argenta Shamrocks players
Marianna Brickeys players
Waco Navigators players
Dallas Giants players
Sioux City Packers players
Galveston Pirates players
Galveston Sand Crabs players
People from Bryant, Arkansas